Serinicoccus is a Gram-positive, strictly aerobic and moderately halophilic bacterial genus from the family Ornithinimicrobiaceae. The genus was formerly in the family Intrasporangiaceae, but later genomic data caused it to be reclassified in 2018.

References

Micrococcales
Bacteria genera